The Minister for the Public Service is an Australian Government cabinet position which is currently held by Katy Gallagher following the swearing in of the full Albanese ministry on 1 June 2022.

In the Government of Australia, the minister administers this portfolio through the Department of the Prime Minister and Cabinet.

List of Ministers for the Public Service
The following individuals have been appointed as Minister for the Public Service, or any of its precedent titles:

List of Assistant Ministers for the Public Service
The following individuals have been appointed as Assistant Minister to the Minister for the Public Service, or any of its precedent titles:

List of Ministers Assisting the Prime Minister for Public Service Industrial Matters
The following individuals have been appointed as Ministers Assisting the Prime Minister for Public Service Industrial Matters, or any of its precedent titles:

References

External links
 

Public Service